The Welsh Conservatives is the branch of the United Kingdom Conservative Party that operates in Wales. At Westminster elections, it is the second-most popular political party in Wales, having obtained the second-largest share of the vote at every general election since 1931. In Senedd elections, the Conservatives are currently the second-most supported party but have at times been third. They hold 14 of the 40 Welsh seats in the UK Parliament, and 16 of the 60 seats in the Senedd.

At the 2021 Senedd election, the Welsh Conservatives won 8 constituency seats, taking Vale of Clwyd from Welsh Labour and Brecon and Radnorshire from the Welsh Liberal Democrats and 26.1% of the constituency vote across Wales, their best constituency seats results since creation of the Senedd in 1999.

History

The Welsh Conservatives were formed (as the Wales and Monmouthshire Conservative and Unionist Council) in 1921 by the merger of the three existing Welsh Provincial Associations of the Party's National Union. For much of their history they were dominated by the party in England, even to the extent of supplying the Welsh Secretaries of State. It was after the Assembly came to be established in 1999, which their members opposed, that they adjusted to becoming more of a Welsh orientated party. Their first leader, the former Welsh Office Minister Rod Richards, showed a combative style of politics against the Labour government. Richards subsequently resigned shortly after the Assembly had become established in response to allegations of an assault, from which he was later cleared. Nicholas Bourne, a law professor and former leader of the No campaign in the Welsh Assembly referendum then became the leader, in an election that was unopposed. From 1999 to 2007 the party remained firmly in opposition in Wales, opposed to forming an alliance with other political parties. This changed in 2007 when the Welsh Conservatives were briefly involved in coalition talks after the indecisive 2007 election on a "rainbow coalition" with the Welsh Liberal Democrats and Plaid Cymru which collapsed after the Liberal Democrats backed out. Plaid Cymru ruled itself out of having a coalition with the Conservatives on an ideological basis. Plaid Cymru and Labour eventually formed the government under the terms of their One Wales agreement. As a result of the agreement, the Conservatives, the largest opposition party, became the Official Opposition in the Welsh Assembly.

In the otherwise mainly successful Welsh Assembly elections of 2011 the long serving Welsh Conservative Leader, Nicholas Bourne (2000–2011) lost his regional list seat in Mid and West Wales. He had been the longest serving of the party political leaders in the Welsh Assembly. The Preseli Pembrokeshire Assembly Member Paul Davies then became the Interim Leader whilst an election took place. The contest was between Andrew RT Davies (South Wales Central) and Nick Ramsay (Monmouthshire). Andrew RT Davies won with some 53.1 per cent of the vote on a 49 per cent turnout of the party's Welsh membership. Also in the post-May 2011 Welsh Assembly elections period David Melding (South Wales Central) was elected as the Deputy Presiding Officer for the Welsh Assembly, the first time a Conservative had held this post.

In the 2022 Welsh local elections, the Conservatives lost half their councillors across Wales and lost control of Monmouthshire County Council.

Electoral performance

House of Commons

Senedd

Local councils

*The 2012 figures excludes Anglesey which was elected in 2013 although the change in seats and votes shown is a direct comparison between the 2008 and 2012 figures in the 21 councils up for election. The 2017 figures are based on changes from the 2012 & 2013 elections.

European Parliament

Appointments

House of Lords

References

Conservative Party
Organisation of the Conservative Party (UK)
1921 establishments in Wales